A molecular model is a physical model of an atomistic system that represents molecules and their processes. They play an important role in understanding chemistry and generating and testing hypotheses. The creation of mathematical models of molecular properties and behavior is referred to as molecular modeling, and their graphical depiction is referred to as molecular graphics.

The term, "molecular model" refer to systems that contain one or more explicit atoms (although solvent atoms may be represented implicitly) and where nuclear structure is neglected. The electronic structure is often also omitted unless it is necessary in illustrating the function of the molecule being modeled.

Molecular models may be created for several reasons – as pedagogic tools for students or those unfamiliar with atomistic structures; as objects to generate or test theories (e.g., the structure of DNA); as analogue computers (e.g., for measuring distances and angles in flexible systems); or as aesthetically pleasing objects on the boundary of art and science.

The construction of physical models is often a creative act, and many bespoke examples have been carefully created in the workshops of science departments. There is a very wide range of approaches to physical modeling, including ball-and-stick models available for purchase commercially, to molecular models created using 3D printers. The main strategy, initially in textbooks and research articles and more recently on computers. Molecular graphics has made the visualization of molecular models on computer hardware easier, more accessible, and inexpensive, although physical models are widely used to enhance the tactile and visual message being portrayed.

History 

In the 1600s, Johannes Kepler speculated on the symmetry of snowflakes and also on the close packing of spherical objects such as fruit (this problem remained unsolved until very recently). The symmetrical arrangement of closely packed spheres informed theories of molecular structure in the late 1800s, and many theories of crystallography and solid state inorganic structure used collections of equal and unequal spheres to simulate packing and predict structure.

John Dalton represented compounds as aggregations of circular atoms, and although Johann Josef Loschmidt did not create physical models, his diagrams based on circles are two-dimensional analogues of later models. August Wilhelm von Hofmann is credited with the first physical molecular model around 1860. Note how the size of the carbon appears smaller than the hydrogen. The  importance of stereochemistry was not then recognised and the model is essentially topological (it should be a 3-dimensional tetrahedron).

Jacobus Henricus van 't Hoff and Joseph Le Bel introduced the concept of chemistry in three dimensions of space, that is, stereochemistry. Van 't Hoff built tetrahedral molecules representing the three-dimensional properties of carbon.

Models based on spheres 

Repeating units will help to show how easy it is and clear it is to represent molecules through balls that represent atoms.

The binary compounds sodium chloride (NaCl) and caesium chloride (CsCl) have cubic structures but have different space groups. This can be rationalised in terms of close packing of spheres of different sizes. For example, NaCl can be described as close-packed chloride ions (in a face-centered cubic lattice) with sodium ions in the octahedral holes. After the development of X-ray crystallography as a tool for determining crystal structures, many laboratories built models based on spheres. With the development of plastic or polystyrene balls it is now easy to create such models.

Models based on ball-and-stick 
The concept of the chemical bond as a direct link between atoms can be modelled by linking balls (atoms) with sticks/rods (bonds). This has been extremely popular and is still widely used today. Initially atoms were made of spherical wooden balls with specially drilled holes for rods. Thus carbon can be represented as a sphere with four holes at the tetrahedral angles cos−1(−) ≈ 109.47°.

A problem with rigid bonds and holes is that systems with arbitrary angles could not be built. This can be overcome with flexible bonds, originally helical springs but now usually plastic. This also allows double and triple bonds to be approximated by multiple single bonds.

The model shown to the left represents a ball-and-stick model of proline. The balls have colours: black represents carbon (C); red, oxygen (O); blue, nitrogen (N); and white, hydrogen (H). Each ball is drilled with as many holes as its conventional valence (C: 4; N: 3; O: 2; H: 1) directed towards the vertices of a tetrahedron. Single bonds are represented by (fairly) rigid grey rods. Double and triple bonds use two longer flexible bonds which restrict rotation and support conventional cis/trans stereochemistry.

However, most molecules require holes at other angles and specialist companies manufacture kits and bespoke models. Besides tetrahedral, trigonal and octahedral holes, there were all-purpose balls with 24 holes. These models allowed rotation about the single rod bonds, which could be both an advantage (showing molecular flexibility) and a disadvantage (models are floppy). The approximate scale was 5 cm per ångström (0.5 m/nm or 500,000,000:1), but was not consistent over all elements.

Arnold Beevers in Edinburgh created small models using PMMA balls and stainless steel rods.  By using individually drilled balls with precise bond angles and bond lengths in these models, large crystal structures to be accurately created, but with light and rigid form.  Figure 4 shows a unit cell of ruby in this style.

Skeletal models 
Crick and Watson's DNA model and the protein-building kits of Kendrew were among the first skeletal models. These were based on atomic components where the valences were represented by rods; the atoms were points at the intersections. Bonds were created by linking components with tubular connectors with locking screws.

André Dreiding introduced a molecular modelling kit in the late 1950s which dispensed with the connectors. A given atom would have solid and hollow valence spikes. The solid rods clicked into the tubes forming a bond, usually with free rotation. These were and are very widely used in organic chemistry departments and were made so accurately that interatomic measurements could be made by ruler.

More recently, inexpensive plastic models (such as Orbit) use a similar principle. A small plastic sphere has protuberances onto which plastic tubes can be fitted. The flexibility of the plastic means that distorted geometries can be made.

Polyhedral models 
Many inorganic solids consist of atoms surrounded by a coordination sphere of electronegative atoms (e.g. PO4 tetrahedra, TiO6 octahedra). Structures can be modelled by gluing together polyhedra made of paper or plastic.

Composite models 

A good example of composite models is the Nicholson approach, widely used from the late 1970s for building models of biological macromolecules. The components are primarily amino acids and nucleic acids with preformed residues representing groups of atoms. Many of these atoms are directly moulded into the template, and fit together by pushing plastic stubs into small holes. The plastic grips well and makes bonds difficult to rotate, so that arbitrary torsion angles can be set and retain their value. The conformations of the backbone and side chains are determined by pre-computing the torsion angles and then adjusting the model with a protractor.

The plastic is white and can be painted to distinguish between O and N atoms. Hydrogen atoms are normally implicit and modelled by snipping off the spokes. A model of a typical protein with approximately 300 residues could take a month to build. It was common for laboratories to build a model for each protein solved. By 2005, so many protein structures were being determined that relatively few models were made.

Computer-based models 

With the development of computer-based physical modelling, it is now possible to create complete single-piece models by feeding the coordinates of a surface into the computer.  Figure 6 shows models of anthrax toxin, left (at a scale of approximately 20 Å/cm or 1:5,000,000) and green fluorescent protein, right (5 cm high, at a scale of about 4 Å/cm or 1:25,000,000) from 3D Molecular Design. Models are made of plaster or starch, using a rapid prototyping process.

It has also recently become possible to create accurate molecular models inside glass blocks using a technique known as subsurface laser engraving.  The image at right shows the 3D structure of an E. coli protein (DNA polymerase beta-subunit, PDB code 1MMI) etched inside a block of glass by British company Luminorum Ltd.

Computational Models 
Computers can also model molecules mathematically. Programs such as Avogadro can run on typical desktops and can predict bond lengths and angles, molecular polarity and charge distribution, and even quantum mechanical properties such as absorption and emission spectra. However, these sorts of programs cannot model molecules as more atoms are added, because the number of calculations is quadratic in the number of atoms involved; if four times as many atoms are used in a molecule, the calculations with take 16 times as long. For most practical purposes, such as drug design or protein folding, the calculations of a model require supercomputing or cannot be done on classical computers at all in a reasonable amount of time. Quantum computers can model molecules with fewer calculations because the type of calculations performed in each cycle by a quantum computer are well-suited to molecular modelling.

Common colors

Some of the most common colors used in molecular models are as follows:
{| class="wikitable"
|Hydrogen
|bgcolor=white| ||white
|-
|Alkali metals
|bgcolor=darkviolet| ||violet
|-
|Alkaline earth metals
|bgcolor=darkgreen| ||dark green
|-
|Boron, most transition metals
|bgcolor=pink| ||Pink
|-
|Carbon
|bgcolor=black| ||black
|-
|Nitrogen
|bgcolor=blue| ||blue
|-
|Oxygen
|bgcolor=red| ||red
|-
|Fluorine
|bgcolor=chartreuse| ||green yellow
|-
|Chlorine
|bgcolor=limegreen| ||lime green
|-
|Bromine
|bgcolor=darkred| ||dark red
|-
|Iodine
|bgcolor=purple| ||dark violet
|-
|Noble gases
|bgcolor=cyan| ||cyan
|-
|Phosphorus
|bgcolor=darkorange| ||orange
|-
|Sulfur
|bgcolor=yellow| ||yellow
|-
|Titanium
|bgcolor=gray| ||gray
|-
|Copper
|bgcolor=ff8866| ||apricot
|-
|Mercury
|bgcolor=lightgrey| ||light grey
|}

Chronology 

This table is an incomplete chronology of events where physical molecular models provided major scientific insights.

See also 
 Molecular design software
 Molecular graphics
 Molecular modelling
 Ribbon diagram
 Software for molecular mechanics modeling
 Space-filling (Calotte) model

References

Further reading 

 
 
  
 history of molecular models Paper presented at the EuroScience Open Forum (ESOF), Stockholm on August 25, 2004 W. Gerhard Pohl, Austrian Chemical Society. Photo of van't Hoff's tetrahedral models, and Loschmidt's organic formulae (only 2-dimensional).
  Wooster's biographical notes including setting up of Crystal Structure Ltd.

External links 

 History of Visualization of Biological Macromolecules by Eric Martz and Eric Francoeur. Contains a mixture of physical models and molecular graphics.

Model